Obstruction Peak is a  summit in the Olympic Mountains and is located in Clallam County of Washington state. It is set within Olympic National Park and is situated at the eastern end of Obstruction Point Road which is a narrow eight mile dirt road on Hurricane Ridge. The road ends below the south slope of Obstruction Peak, and a short hike leads to the summit. Its nearest higher peak is Elk Mountain,  to the northeast. Obstruction Peak is a major triple divide point such that precipitation runoff drains into tributaries of the Elwha River, Dungeness River, and Morse Creek. All three thence empty into the Strait of Juan de Fuca.

Climate

Set in the north-central portion of the Olympic Mountains, Obstruction Peak is located in the marine west coast climate zone of western North America. Most weather fronts originate in the Pacific Ocean, and travel northeast toward the Olympic Mountains. As fronts approach, they are forced upward by the peaks of the Olympic Range, causing them to drop their moisture in the form of rain or snowfall (Orographic lift). As a result, the Olympics experience high precipitation, especially during the winter months in the form of snowfall. Because of maritime influence, snow tends to be wet and heavy, resulting in high avalanche danger. During winter months, weather is usually cloudy, but due to high pressure systems over the Pacific Ocean that intensify during summer months, there is often little or no cloud cover during the summer. The months July through September offer the most favorable weather for viewing or climbing this peak.

History 
It's believed that a road-building project in the 1940s was expected to run a full-circle loop from the Elwha River to Hurricane Ridge and Deer Park, then on to Port Angeles. The project was stopped at Obstruction Point because of loose shale and inherent instability of the slopes here, hence the obstruction.

References

External links
 Weather forecast: Obstruction Peak
 

Mountains of Washington (state)
Olympic Mountains
Mountains of Clallam County, Washington
Landforms of Olympic National Park
North American 1000 m summits